The Cornelius Ryan Award is given for "best nonfiction book on international affairs" by the Overseas Press Club of America (OPC).  To be eligible for this literary award a book must be published "in the US or by a US based company or distributed for an American audience" during the year prior to that in which the award is given.  The winner is chosen in a competition juried by peers from the journalism industry.

Recipients of the award receive a certificate and $1000.  The Cornelius Ryan Award is one of 25 different awards currently given by the OPC for excellence in journalism at their annual award dinner, usually held at the end of April.  The award is named for the journalist and author Cornelius Ryan, who himself, twice received this, his own namesake award (1959 for The Longest Day and 1974 for A Bridge Too Far).

In 2009 the judges were Chris Power (Bloomberg BusinessWeek), Robert Dowling (Caixin Media Group), and Robert Teitelman (The Deal).

References

External links
Overseas Press Club of America, official website

Awards established in 1957
1957 establishments in the United States
American journalism awards
American non-fiction literary awards
International relations